Cultural Tourism DC is an independent non-profit coalition of more than 230 culture, heritage, and community-based organizations in Washington, DC. Cultural Tourism DC and its members develop and present programs in Washington for area residents and visitors. Member organizations represent cultural and community organizations throughout Washington, DC; they include large institutions such as the John F. Kennedy Center for the Performing Arts and U.S. National Arboretum to smaller ones such as the Frederick Douglass House and the Hillwood Estate, Museum & Gardens.

Programs
Cultural Tourism DC (CTDC) offers a range of guided and self-guided walking tours of historic neighborhoods in Washington, DC:
 Neighborhood Heritage Trail: The Neighborhood Heritage Trails relate the history of DC's communities through poster-sized street signs displaying text, maps, and historic photos. The walking tour can be combined with an accompanying free guidebook. A few of the tours also offer an accompanying audio walking tour guide. As of 2013, CTDC had created Heritage Trails for twenty-two DC neighborhoods:
Adams Morgan
Brightwood
Brookland
Capitol Hill
Chinatown
Connecticut Avenue Corridor (including Woodley Park, Cleveland Park, Van Ness, Tenleytown, the National Zoo, and the National Cathedral)
Columbia Heights
Deanwood
Downtown (following Pennsylvania Avenue from the White House past the National Gallery of Art, many of the Smithsonian Institution museums, and ending at the United States Capitol).
Dupont Circle/Sheridan-Kalorama
East of the Anacostia River
Foggy Bottom
Georgetown
Georgia Ave.
Greater U Street
Lafayette Square
H Street, NE
Mount Pleasant
Shaw 
Sixteenth St. Corridor (extending from Lafayette Square through the Dupont Circle, Logan Circle, and Greater U Street neighborhoods and ending at Meridian Hill/Malcolm X Park)
Southwest
Tenleytown

Cultural Tourism DC also offers an African American Heritage Trail that highlights significant sites in African American history in multiple locations around the city.

 Passport DC, an annual event that occurs each May, where many of the more than 187 embassies and international cultural centers in Washington, DC open their doors to showcase their culture, art, music, dance and food. The event features street festivals, open houses, embassy events, special performances and other events
 WalkingTown DC and BikingTown DC, a two-week program that features free guided walking and biking tours of neighborhoods across the city. Tour topics include history, architecture, and local development.
 The Embassy Chef Challenge, an annual fundraising benefit featuring international tastings, awards, entertainment, and a silent auction.
 The PorchFest, which invites Washington area visitors to celebrate local talent by turning the front stoops of several neighborhood homes and businesses into performance spaces where local musicians play for the community.

External links
 Cultural Tourism DC official website
 About Cultural Tourism DC
 DC Heritage Trails via NPS

Tourism in Washington, D.C.
Organizations based in Washington, D.C.